Marco Archer Cardoso Moreira (Manaus, Brazil, 1961 - Nusa Kambangan, Indonesia, 18 January 2015) was a Brazilian citizen sentenced to death for drug trafficking in Indonesia in 2004 after being arrested while trying to enter the country with 13.4 kg of cocaine inside the tube of a hang glider. Archer was the first Brazilian citizen to be executed abroad.

Early life

Marco was born in a wealthy family in Manaus, Brazil, and his mother, Carolina, was a state civil servant in Rio de Janeiro, after the family moved into that city. He began drug trafficking as a teenager, directly with Colombian cartels, bringing cocaine from Medellin to Rio de Janeiro and to the United States. As an adult, he became a paraglider and frequently travelled to Southeastern Asia to engage in the sport. In 1997, he suffered an accident in Bali that almost cost him his life.

Archer was described as having travelled around the world, having a very extensive and successful love life and enjoying a lavish life, and also as never having used a single weapon throughout his career in drug trafficking.

Arrest

Marco Archer was arrested at Soekarno–Hatta International Airport, Jakarta, in 2003, with 13.4 kilos of cocaine hidden inside hang-gliding tubes. He lived on the Indonesian island of Bali for 15 years and spoke Indonesian fluently.

He fled, but was eventually captured 15 days later, while trying to escape to East Timor. He was prosecuted, convicted for drug trafficking and sentenced to death.

During his early days in prison, Archer shared a cell with fellow Brazilian convicted Rodrigo Gularte.

Execution

Marco Archer was shot in the early hours of January 18, 2015, after eleven years in the Indonesian death row and several delays of his execution, in the prison complex of Cilacap Prison, in Java Island, 400 kilometres from Jakarta, the country's capital.

Marco Archer had his last Roman Catholic rites denied, according to Roman Catholic Priest Charles Burrows who was responsible to comfort him in the last moments of his death. Archer was dragged from his cell, as he cried and said "help me."

Archer chose to be executed on foot and blindfolded, according to the "Folha de S. Paulo". He died with a single shot fired into his chest.

Moreira was Roman Catholic and Brazilian embassy had hoped that at least spiritual solace before his death would be offered to him.

However, Indonesian authorities refused the presence of a priest, because there was no letter from Marco's attorney allowing spiritual presence .

After the execution of Marco Archer, his body was cremated and his ashes were transported to Brazil.

In Rio de Janeiro a Catholic Mass was celebrated in honour of him.

Reactions
His execution, after being denied all requests for clemency made by the Brazilian government, created a crisis between Brazil and Indonesia. This resulted in the recall of the Brazilian ambassador in Jakarta to return to Brazil under the instructions of the government of President Dilma Rousseff.

After Archer's death, the president of Brazil, Dilma Rousseff, issued a statement saying she was outraged and the execution seriously affected the relationships between the two countries. She called the Brazilian ambassador for consultations.

See also
 Rodrigo Gularte

References

1961 births
2015 deaths
2015 in Brazil
2015 in Indonesia
21st-century Brazilian criminals
Brazilian drug traffickers
Brazilian people executed abroad
Brazilian Roman Catholics
People executed by Indonesia by firing squad
People executed for drug offences
21st-century executions by Indonesia
Inmates of Nusa Kambangan prison
People from Rio de Janeiro (city)